Armin Eichholz (born 21 May 1964) is a retired competition rower from West Germany. He won two Olympic medals in the coxed eight event: a gold in 1988 and a bronze in 1992, and in 1991 he won a world title in the coxed fours.

References

External links
 
 
 

1964 births
Living people
Sportspeople from Duisburg
West German male rowers
German male rowers
Olympic rowers of West Germany
Olympic rowers of Germany
Olympic gold medalists for West Germany
Olympic bronze medalists for Germany
Olympic medalists in rowing
Rowers at the 1988 Summer Olympics
Rowers at the 1992 Summer Olympics
Medalists at the 1992 Summer Olympics
Medalists at the 1988 Summer Olympics
World Rowing Championships medalists for Germany